McEneny is a surname. Notable people with the surname include:

Evan McEneny (born 1994), Canadian ice hockey player
 George McAneny (1869-1953), American Manhattan Borough President and New York City Comptroller
John McEneny (born 1943), American politician

See also
McEnany, surname